The Fagaceae are a family of flowering plants that includes beeches, chestnuts and oaks, and comprises eight genera with about 927 species. Fagaceae in temperate regions are mostly deciduous, whereas in the tropics, many species occur as evergreen trees and shrubs. They are characterized by alternate simple leaves with pinnate venation, unisexual flowers in the form of catkins, and fruit in the form of cup-like (cupule) nuts. Their leaves are often lobed and both petioles and stipules are generally present. Their fruits lack endosperm and lie in a scaly or spiny husk that may or may not enclose the entire nut, which may consist of one to seven seeds. In the oaks, genus Quercus, the fruit is a non-valved nut (usually containing one seed) called an acorn. The husk of the acorn in most oaks only forms a cup in which the nut sits. Other members of the family have fully enclosed nuts. Fagaceae is one of the most ecologically important woody plant families in the Northern Hemisphere, as oaks form the backbone of temperate forest in North America, Europe, and Asia, and are one of the most significant sources of wildlife food.

Several members of the Fagaceae have important economic uses. Many species of oak, chestnut, and beech (genera Quercus, Castanea, and Fagus, respectively) are commonly used as timber for floors, furniture, cabinets, and wine barrels.  Cork for stopping wine bottles and a myriad other uses is made from the bark of cork oak, Quercus suber. Chestnuts are the fruits from species of the genus Castanea. Numerous species from several genera are prominent ornamentals, and wood chips from the genus Fagus are often used in flavoring beers. Nuts of some species in the Asian tropical genera Castanopsis and Lithocarpus are edible and often used as ornamentals.

Classification
The Fagaceae are often divided into five or six subfamilies and are generally accepted to include 8 (to 10) genera (listed below). Monophyly of the Fagaceae is strongly supported by both morphological (especially fruit morphology) and molecular data.

The Southern Hemisphere genus Nothofagus, commonly the southern beeches, was historically placed in the Fagaceae sister to the genus Fagus, but recent molecular evidence suggests otherwise.  While Nothofagus shares a number of common characteristics with the Fagaceae, such as cupule fruit structure, it differs significantly in a number of ways, including distinct stipule and pollen morphology, as well as having a different number of chromosomes. The currently accepted view by systematic botanists is to place Nothofagus in its own family, Nothofagaceae.

Subfamilies and genera
 Fagoideae K. Koch
Fagus L.—beeches; about 10 to 13 species, north temperate east Asia, southwest Asia, Europe, eastern North America
 Quercoideae Õrsted
Castanea Mill. 1754—chestnuts; eight species, north temperate east Asia, southwest Asia, southeast Europe, eastern North America
Castanopsis (D. Don) Spach 1841—chinquapins or chinkapins; about 125–130 species, southeast Asia
Chrysolepis Hjelmq. 1948—golden chinkapins; two species, western United States
Lithocarpus Blume 1826—stone oaks; about 330-340 species, warm temperate to tropical Asia
Notholithocarpus P. S. Manos, C. H. Cannon & S.H. Oh 2008 [2009]—Tanoaks; 1 species (formerly Lithocarpus densiflorus), endemic to California and southwest Oregon
Quercus L. 1753—oaks; about 600 species, widespread Northern Hemisphere, crossing the equator in Indonesia
Trigonobalanus Forman 1962—three species, tropical southeast Asia, Northern South America (Colombia) (three species of Colombobalanus and Formanodendron are included)

The Quercus subgenus Cyclobalanopsis is treated as a distinct genus by the Flora of China, but as a subgenus by most taxonomists.

The genus Nothofagus (southern beeches; about 40 species from the Southern Hemisphere), formerly included in the Fagaceae, is now treated in the separate family Nothofagaceae.

Distribution
The Fagaceae are widely distributed across the Northern Hemisphere.  Genus-level diversity is concentrated in Southeast Asia, where most of the extant genera are thought to have evolved before migrating to Europe and North America (via the Bering Land Bridge). Members of the Fagaceae (such as Fagus grandifolia, Castanea dentata and Quercus alba in the Northeastern United States, or Fagus sylvatica, Quercus robur and Q. petraea in Europe) are often ecologically dominant in northern temperate forests. In tropical Southeast Asia, more than 400 species of Castanopsis and Lithocarpus are occur, with some species performing similar dominant roles over large areas.

Systematics
Modern molecular phylogenetics suggest the following relationships:

Images

References

External links

Fagaceae in Topwalks
Family Fagaceae - diagnostic photos of many species at The Morton Arboretum

 
Rosid families